Armando Mencía (born 22 April 1903, date of death unknown) was a Swiss composer. His work was part of the music event in the art competition at the 1932 Summer Olympics.

References

1903 births
Year of death missing
Swiss male composers
Olympic competitors in art competitions
People from Havana